Perdona nuestros pecados (Spanish for Forgive our sins) is a Chilean drama telenovela that premiered on Mega on March 6, 2017. The series is created by Pablo Illanes and written by Josefina Fernández. It stars Mariana Di Girolamo, Mario Horton, Álvaro Rudolphy and Paola Volpato as main characters.

Series overview

Cast

Main characters 
 Álvaro Rudolphy as Armando Quiroga
 Paola Volpato as Ángela Bulnes
 Mario Horton as Father Reynaldo Suárez
 Mariana Di Girolamo as María Elsa Quiroga de Moller
 Patricia Rivadeneira as Estela Undurraga de Quiroga
 Andrés Velasco as Lamberto Montero
 Francisca Gavilán as Silvia Corcuera
 Fernanda Ramírez as Augusta Montero de Moller
 Etienne Bobenrieth as Camilo Corcuera 
 Carmen Disa Gutiérrez as Lidia Ilic
 Ximena Rivas as Guillermina Márquez
 César Caillet as Ernesto Möller
 Nicolás Oyarzún as Gerardo Montero
 Constanza Araya as Antonieta Corcuera
 Mabel Farías as Fresia Toro
 José Antonio Raffo as Carlos Möller
 Gabriel Cañas as Horacio Möller
 Alejandra Araya as María Isabel Quiroga
 María Soledad Cruz as María Mercedes Möller
 Romina Norambuena as Ingrid Ormeño
 Félix Villar as Renzo Moreno
 Francisco Godoy as Martín Quiroga
 Catalina Benítez as Sofía Quiroga
 Andrés Commentz as Domingo Quiroga

Recurring characters 
 Katyna Huberman as Elvira Undurraga
 Héctor Noguera as Obispo Remigio Subercaseaux
 Consuelo Holzapfel as Clemencia Valdeavellano
 Alejandro Goic as Iván Carrasco
 Lorena Capetillo as Nora del Solar
 María José Bello as Bárbara Román de Pereira
 Christián Zuñiga as Lautaro Fuenzalida
 Roxana Naranjo as Rocío Paillán
 Víctor Montero as Manuel Cid
 Hugo Vásquez as Doctor Leonidas Concha
 Gonzalo Muñoz Lerner as Luis Sánchez
 Margarita Llanos as Georgina López
 Elizabeth Torres as Zenaida Urraz
 Cristián Carvajal as Nicanor Pereira
 Claudio Arredondo as Father Esteban Madrid

Ratings

References 

2017 telenovelas
2017 Chilean television series debuts
2018 Chilean television series endings
Chilean telenovelas
Spanish-language telenovelas
Mega (Chilean TV channel) telenovelas